Cranichis is a genus of flowering plants from the orchid family, Orchidaceae. It contains about 50 species, native to South America, Central America, Mexico and the West Indies, with one species (C. muscosa) extending into Florida.

Species 

 Cranichis acuminatissima 
 Cranichis amplectens 
 Cranichis antioquiensis 
 Cranichis apiculata 
 Cranichis brachyblephara 
 Cranichis callifera 
 Cranichis calva 
 Cranichis candida 
 Cranichis castellanosii 
 Cranichis ciliata 
 Cranichis ciliilabia 
 Cranichis cochleata 
 Cranichis crumenifera 
 Cranichis diphylla 
 Cranichis elliptica 
 Cranichis engelii 
 Cranichis fendleri 
 Cranichis foliosa 
 Cranichis galatea 
 Cranichis garayana 
 Cranichis gibbosa 
 Cranichis glabricaulis 
 Cranichis glandulosa 
 Cranichis gracilis 
 Cranichis hassleri 
 Cranichis hieroglyphica 
 Cranichis lankesteri 
 Cranichis lehmanniana 
 Cranichis lehmannii 
 Cranichis lichenophila 
 Cranichis longipetiolata 
 Cranichis macroblepharis 
 Cranichis muscosa 
 Cranichis notata 
 Cranichis nudilabia 
 Cranichis ovata 
 Cranichis parvula 
 Cranichis picta 
 Cranichis polyantha 
 Cranichis pulvinifera 
 Cranichis reticulata 
 Cranichis revoluta 
 Cranichis ricartii 
 Cranichis saccata 
 Cranichis scripta 
 Cranichis sparrei 
 Cranichis subumbellata 
 Cranichis sylvatica 
 Cranichis talamancana 
 Cranichis tenuis 
 Cranichis turkeliae 
 Cranichis wageneri 
 Cranichis werffii

References 

  (1788) Nova Genera et Species Plantarum seu Prodromus 8, 120.
  (2003) Genera Orchidacearum 3: 29 ff. Oxford University Press.
  2005. Handbuch der Orchideen-Namen. Dictionary of Orchid Names. Dizionario dei nomi delle orchidee. Ulmer, Stuttgart

External links 

Cranichideae genera
Cranichidinae
Taxa named by Olof Swartz